Gabriela may refer to:

 Gabriela (given name), a Spanish, Portuguese and Romanian feminine given name
 Gabriela (1942 film), a Czech film
 Gabriela (1950 film), a German film
 Gabriela (1983 film), a Brazilian film
 Gabriela (2001 film), an American film
 Gabriela (1960 TV series), a Mexican telenovela
 Gabriela (1964 TV series), a Mexican telenovela
 Gabriela (1975 TV series), a 1975 Brazilian telenovela
 Gabriela (2012 TV series), a 2012 Brazilian telenovela
 Gabriela Women's Party (General Assembly Binding Women for Reforms, Integrity, Equality, Leadership, and Action), a feminist Filipino political alliance

See also
Gabriella (disambiguation)